James Bertram Cunningham (September 28, 1872 – ?) was a politician in the Canadian province of Ontario, who served in the Legislative Assembly of Ontario from 1919 to 1923. He represented the electoral district of Sault Ste. Marie as a member of the Labour Party, and served in the United Farmers of Ontario-Labour coalition government of Ernest Charles Drury.

References

External links
 

Year of death missing
Politicians from Simcoe County
Labour MPPs in Ontario
1872 births